"Ice Cream"  or "I Scream, You Scream, We All Scream for Ice Cream" is a popular song, first published in 1927, with words and music by Howard Johnson, Billy Moll, and Robert A. King.  After initial success as a late 1920s novelty song, the tune became a traditional jazz standard, while the lyrics refrain "I Scream, You Scream, We All Scream for Ice Cream" has remained a part of popular culture even without the rest of the song.

On January 1, 2023, the song went into the public domain.

1920s novelty song
The song was one of a series of comic novelty songs set in "exotic" locations, one of the earliest and most famous being "Oh By Jingo!" The verses of "Ice Cream" talk of a fictional college in "the land of ice and snow, up among the Eskimo", the college cheer being the chorus of the song "I Scream, You Scream, We All Scream for Ice Cream".

Notable recordings of the tune in the 1920s include by Waring's Pennsylvanians for Victor, Harry Reser's Syncopators for Columbia, and The Revelers for Edison Records.

Traditional jazz standard
In New Orleans in 1944, William Russell recorded a small jazz combo with George Lewis and Jim Robinson for his American Music label. Robinson cut loose with an unexpectedly virtuosic performance on an instrumental of the tune "Ice Cream". The side was issued as by "Jim Robinson's Band". The tune became a standard for Robinson, imitated by other Dixieland jazz trombonists including Chris Barber, and remains in the traditional jazz repertoire.

When Barber's band first recorded the song in 1954, they basically knew the instrumental Lewis version. The record producer asked them to sing it, which was slightly problematic, since they didn't know the full lyrics. So trumpeter Pat Halcox invented his own lyrics; these are nowadays better known than the original 1920s version.

Popular culture
The song is featured in the 1931 Krazy Kat cartoon Soda Poppa.
The refrain is used in what becomes a prison chant in the 1986 film Down by Law.
In the comic series Spawn, the character Billy Kincaid recites the song several times.  
The song is featured in two episodes of the first season of Barney & Friends.
American rapper RZA interpolated "Ice Cream" on his debut album Bobby Digital in Stereo (1998) in the song "My Lovin' is Digi".
One episode of Masters of Horror was titled We All Scream for Ice Cream.
Songwriter Tyler Joseph of the American rock band Twenty One Pilots wrote "I scream, you scream, we all scream 'cause we're terrified," in their 2011 song named "Forest", as a play on words with this popular song.
Bunk'd Hazel sings the main part.
Judy Moody and the Not Bummer Summer Stink sings a similar song.
The song was recited in the science fiction show Farscape by its protagonist Jon Crichton (Ben Browder).
One episode of Charmed was titled We All Scream for Ice Cream.
Paul Winchell and his ventriloquist dummy Jerry Mahoney recorded a version of the song in the 50s.
The refrain is used in an early 1990s commercial for Hershey’s Chocolate Syrup.
The phrase was inspiration for the song Ice Cream Cake by Korean Girl Group Red Velvet.
The name of the song was referenced in the name of a mission "I Scream, You Scream" in the 2001 video game Grand Theft Auto III.
The song is recited by Michelangelo in the episode "The Ultimate Ninja" in the 2003 Teenage Mutant Ninja Turtles cartoon series.
In the dream sequence in the beginning of Max Keeble's Big Move, Max's nemesis, the Evil Ice Cream Man, fittingly recites the lyric when about to fire his ice cream cannon at Max.
The title of the song, "I scream, you scream, we all scream for ice cream", was used in the second episode of the season 2 of "Chilling Adventure of Sabrina".
The phrase is used in a chant in Super Smash Bros. Ultimate. When the crowd chants for the fighter Ice Climbers (if played by a human player), they say, "I scream, you scream, Ice Climbers!".
Honoka in the Dead or Alive Xtreme Venus Vacation event episode The Ice Cream Crisis briefly says "I Scream for Ice Cream!" while reacting excitedly to going to an ice cream shop in the beginning.

References

External links

Sheet Music at Internet Archive

1927 songs
1920s jazz standards
Novelty songs
Songs with lyrics by Howard Johnson (lyricist)
Songs written by Robert A. King (composer)